Samana acutata is a species of moth in the family Geometridae This species is endemic to New Zealand. It is classified as "At Risk, Relict" by the Department of Conservation.

Taxonomy 
This species was first described by Arthur Gardiner Butler in 1877 using a specimen that was collected from Christchurch, in the South Island and was obtained from J. D. Enys. George Hudson discussed this species in his 1898 book New Zealand moths and butterflies (Macro-lepidoptera). He later discussed and illustrated this species in his 1928 book The Butterflies and Moths of New Zealand. The holotype specimen is held at the Natural History Museum, London.

Description 

Butler described the species as follows:

Distribution 
This species is endemic to New Zealand. S. acutata can be found in Mid Canterbury and Central Otago. It is now extinct at its type locality.

Life cycle and behaviour 
Larvae of this species have been found in January and in March. The adult is on the wing in September and October. Hudson stated this species is attracted to light.

Host species and habitat 
The host species for this moth are the New Zealand native brooms in the genus Carmichaelia including Carmichaelia australis and Carmichaelia appressa. The species is known to inhabit dune ecosystems. It has also been found in habitat containing gorse and mānuka.

Conservation status 
This moth is classified under the New Zealand Threat Classification system as being "At Risk, Relict". This species is threatened as a result of change of habitat, in particular the loss of its host species due to farming and urban development. It is also at risk from weed invasion from plants such as sea spurge.

References

Moths of New Zealand
Endemic fauna of New Zealand
Moths described in 1877
Geometridae
Endangered biota of New Zealand
Taxa named by Arthur Gardiner Butler
Endemic moths of New Zealand